List of communities in Guysborough County, Nova Scotia

Communities are ordered by the highway upon which they are located.  All routes start with the terminus located near the largest community.

Trunk routes

Trunk 7: Aspen - Melrose - Stillwater - Sherbrooke - Goldenville - Liscomb - Spanish Ship Bay - Liscomb Mills - Marie Joseph - Ecum Secum
Trunk 16: Canso - Hazel Hill - Fox Island Main - Philips Harbour - Queensport - Halfway Cove - Guysborough - Boylston

Collector roads

Route 211: Isaac's Harbour North - Port Bickerton - Harpellville - Port Hilford - Indian Harbour Lake - Jordanville
Route 276: Goshen
Route 316: Argyle - Goshen - Eight Island Lake - Cross Roads Country Harbour - Country Harbour Mines - Isaac's Harbour North - Goldboro - Drumhead - Seal Harbour - Coddle's Harbour - New Harbour - Larry's River - Charlos Cove - Cole Harbour - Port Felix
Route 344: Mulgrave - Middle Melford - Sand Point - St. Francis Harbour - Port Shoreham - Boylston
Route 348: Glenelg - Smithfield - Lower Caledonia - Caledonia
Route 376: Trafalgar

Communities located on rural roads

Alder River
Cameron Settlement
Crow's Nest
Little Dover
Erinville
Forest Hill
Giant's Lake
Glencoe
Isaac's Harbour
Lincolnville
Lundy
New Chester
Ogden
Roachvale
Roman Valley
Salmon River Lake
Spanish Ship Bay
Sonora 
South Merland
St Mary's River
Torbay
Whitehead
Wine Harbour

See also

Guysborough County

Geography of Guysborough County, Nova Scotia